Vinnik is a surname. Notable people with the surname include:

Alexander Vinnik (born  1979), Russian computer expert
Vyacheslav Vinnik (born 1939), Soviet sprint canoer

See also
Vinnikov